Derrick T. Hamilton (born November 30, 1981) is a former American football wide receiver. He was drafted by the San Francisco 49ers in the third round of the 2004 NFL Draft. He played college football at Clemson.

Hamilton was also a member of the Atlanta Falcons, Tampa Bay Buccaneers, Houston Texans, Denver Broncos and Toronto Argonauts.

Early years
Hamilton played his high school football at Dillon High School. His senior season in high school, Hamilton had more interceptions returned for touchdowns than receptions returned for touchdowns.  His high school career totals were 36 catches for 745 yds and 9 touchdowns. This was mainly because his high school team mostly ran the ball. He had eight kickoffs returned for scores (plus eight more returned for touchdowns that were called back for penalties), and eight INT's with 3 returned for scores.

Professional career

San Francisco 49ers
Hamilton never caught a pass in his time with the 49ers and played in only the final two games of his rookie season (2004). Hamilton tore a ligament in his left knee during a summer workout and did not play a down in his second year in the NFL (2005).

While supposedly nursing his damaged knee, Hamilton did not participate in summer training activities.   Early in training camp, Hamilton injured his hamstring and barely participated in workouts.

On August 11, of the 2006 San Francisco 49ers season, Hamilton was waived without ever catching a single pass.

Atlanta Falcons
After being signed by the Atlanta Falcons on March 15, 2007, he was waived on June 12, 2007.

Tampa Bay Buccaneers
On October 24, 2007, Hamilton was signed to the practice squad of the Tampa Bay Buccaneers following a season-ending injury to wide receiver Mark Jones. Hamilton was released a week later.

Houston Texans
On November 21, 2007, Hamilton was signed to the Houston Texans' practice squad and remained there through the end of the 2007 season before becoming a free agent.

Denver Broncos
On February 11, 2008, Hamilton was signed by the Denver Broncos. He was waived on April 15, just one day after the team added receiver Samie Parker.

Toronto Argonauts
On January 29, 2009, Hamilton was signed by the Toronto Argonauts. He was released on June 7, 2009.

References

External links
Clemson Tigers bio
Denver Broncos bio
San Francisco 49ers bio
Toronto Argonauts bio

1981 births
Living people
People from Dillon, South Carolina
American football wide receivers
American players of Canadian football
Canadian football wide receivers
Clemson Tigers football players
San Francisco 49ers players
Atlanta Falcons players
Tampa Bay Buccaneers players
Houston Texans players
Denver Broncos players
Toronto Argonauts players